Priority traffic signs indicate the order in which vehicles should pass intersection points. Vehicles often come into conflict with other vehicles and pedestrians because their intended courses of travel intersect, and thus interfere with each other's routes.  The general principle that establishes who has the right to go first is called "right of way" or "priority". It establishes who has the right to use the conflicting part of the road and who has to wait until the other does so. The vehicle that does not need to wait is said to "have the right of way" or to "have priority."

Types of sign 

A Give way sign, also known as a yield sign in some countries, informs the driver that they must give way to vehicles on the major road. Under the Vienna Convention, the standard sign should be a white or yellow inverted triangle with a red border. This originates in Denmark, with the red and white coming from the Danish flag. In some countries, the words Give Way or equivalent may be included with the sign. These signs are usually accompanied by a give way marking, normally one or multiple dashed lines or shark teeth across the carriageway.

Alternative priority systems

See also

 Priority to the right
 Stop sign
 Vienna Convention on Road Signs and Signals
 Yield sign

References

Traffic signs